Finn Bø (4 July 1893 – 24 April 1962) was a Norwegian songwriter, revue writer, playwright, journalist, instructor and theatre critic.

Career
Bø is particularly remembered for his song Norge i rødt, hvitt og blått, which became extremely popular in 1945. Among his other popular songs are "Nå går'n på gummisåler" and "Bare rundt omkring", both from 1928. He published the anecdote collection Forbuden frukt in 1945, and the song collection Jeg tar mig den frihet in 1946. Several of his plays were also adapted into films.

Personal life
His parents were Johan Christian Andreas Bø (1850–1924) and Valborg Hansen (1863–1910). He married Alfhild Knagenhjelm Poppe in 1930. He received a degree in chemical engineering from the Norwegian Institute of Technology in 1916, but from 1920 onward he mainly worked as a writer and journalist.

Selected works

Plays / revue comedies 
 Den enes død (sm.m. S. Hoel), 1921
 Du har lovet mig en kone!, 1934 (filmmanus 1935)
 Hele byen snakker, 1936 og 1957
 I moralens navn, 1937
 Det store spørsmål, 1940 (filmmanus En herre med bart, 1942)
 Halmstrået, 1940
 Konge for en natt, 1940 (filmmanus Hansen og Hansen, 1941)
 Trollfossen (filmmanus sm.m. A. Scott-Hansen og S. Hoel), 1948
 To liv, 1946
 Hele byen flagger, 1950
 Se deg om i glede, 1959
 Fordi jeg elsker deg, 1961

Song and anecdote collections 
 Forbuden frukt, 1945
 Jeg tar meg den frihet, 1946
 Ondt ord igjen, 1951
 I Tigerstadens jungel, 1961

Discography (selection) 
 Gamle revyviser (div. artister), 1978
 Lalla Carlsen, 1989
 Einar Rose: Landskampen, 1994

References

1893 births
1962 deaths
Musicians from Oslo
Norwegian songwriters
Norwegian theatre critics
20th-century Norwegian dramatists and playwrights
Norwegian male dramatists and playwrights
20th-century Norwegian journalists